This article is a list of full-power and low-power CBC Radio AM-only transmitters in Canada for the CBC Radio One and Première Chaîne networks which are still in operation on AM radio frequencies as of 2018. There are a total of about 100 or more AM transmitters which are still in operation by the CBC across Canada, As there may be some transmitters missing from the list below, this list may not necessary be complete. Since the 1980s, a vast number of CBC full and low-power AM transmitters have already moved to the FM band, with some new FM transmitters being added. It is possible that all or most of these AM transmitters listed below may eventually move to the FM band or completely cease broadcasting in the near future.

British Columbia

CBC Radio One

Full-power
CBU 690 AM Vancouver (also broadcasts in FM to some of its coverage area on nested transmitters, including to Greater Vancouver, Abbotsford, and Chilliwack)
CFPR 860 AM Prince Rupert

Low-power
CBKA 1450 AM Stewart
CBKG 920 AM Granisle
CBKJ 860 AM Gold River
CBKM 860 AM Blue River
CBKN 990 AM Shalalth
CBKO 540 AM Coal Harbour
CBKU 630 AM Sayward
CBKY 1350 AM Keremeos
CBKZ 860 AM Clearwater
CBPM 1260 AM Sicamous
CBRH 1170 AM New Hazelton
CBRK 900 AM Kimberley
CBRZ 1350 AM Bralorne
CBTG 860 AM Gold Bridge
CBUG 860 AM Kaslo
CBUN 740 AM Salmo
CBUP 860 AM Merritt
CBWF 920 AM Mackenzie
CBXA 1150 AM Mica Dam
CBYW 540 AM Wells
CFHG 1490 AM Holberg

Alberta

CBC Radio One

Full-power
CBR 1010 AM Calgary (also broadcasts in FM to some of its coverage area on a nested transmitter)
CBX 740 AM Edmonton (also broadcasts in FM to some of its coverage area on a nested transmitter)

Low-power
As of February 2013, all the remaining CBC low-power AM transmitters in Alberta have received approval from the CRTC to convert to the FM band.

Saskatchewan

CBC Radio One

Full-power
CBK 540 AM Watrous (also broadcasts in FM into some of its coverage area on nested transmitters, including Regina and Saskatoon)

Première Chaîne

Full-power
CBKF-1 690 AM Gravelbourg
CBKF-2 860 AM Saskatoon

Manitoba

CBC Radio One

Full-power
CBW 990 AM Winnipeg (also broadcasts in FM to some of its coverage area on a nested transmitter)

Low-power
CFNC 1490 AM Cross Lake (rebroadcasts the programming of CBWK-FM, but are owned by local community groups rather than by the CBC).
CHFC 1230 AM Churchill

Première Chaîne

Full-power
CKSB 1050 AM Winnipeg (also operated on FM to some of its coverage area on a nested transmitter) (Both AM transmitter and nested transmitter had moved to 88.1 MHz).

Low-power
CKSB-2 860 AM St. Lazare

Ontario

CBC Radio One

Low-power
CBES 690 AM Ignace
CBLE 1240 AM Beardmore
CBLF 1450 AM Foleyet
CBLO 1240 AM Mattawa

Première Chaîne

Full-power
 CJBC 860 AM Toronto
 CBEF 1550 AM Windsor (also operates on a nested FM transmitter). On November 1, 2012, CBEF began broadcasting on 1550 AM, moving over from 540.

Low-power
CBOF-4 1400 AM Rolphton (Moving to FM 98.5; approved November 28, 2022)
CBON-12 1090 AM Mattawa

Quebec
Note that due to a vast number of CBC low-power AM transmitters in Quebec, such as the repeaters of CBF, CBSI and CBVE are not listed here and its uncertain if most of these transmitters are still currently in operation. It's also uncertain if most of these CBC transmitters
currently listed below are still in operation.

CBC Radio One

Low-power
CBOM 710 AM Maniwaki (Moving to FM 93.3; approved June 1, 2022)
CBMD 1400 AM Chapais

Première Chaîne

Low-power
CBJ-2 1140 AM Chapais
CBF-16 990 AM Clova (formerly CBV-3) (Moving to FM)
CBF-17 710 AM Lac-Édouard (formerly CBV-2) On November 17, 2021, the CBC submitted an application to the CRTC to move CBF-17 Lac-Édouard, Quebec from the AM band 710 kHz to the FM band at 99.9 MHz.  This application is pending CRTC approval.

CBOF-1 990 AM Maniwaki (Moving to FM 94.3; approved June 1, 2022)
CBSI-14 1350 AM Aguanish (Moving to FM)
CBSI-5 1100 AM Natashquan (Moved to 99.9 FM)
CBF-18 710 AM Parent (formerly CBV-1 1240 AM)
CBSI-23 1130 AM Port-Menier
CBSI-8 1550 AM La Romaine (Moving to FM)

Prince Edward Island
There are no full-power and low-power CBC-owned AM transmitters on Prince Edward Island for CBC Radio One and Première Chaîne. Although, there
are two CBC-owned tourist information AM stations located in Prince Edward Island National Park: CBPP 1490 AM and CBPP-1 1280 AM

Nova Scotia

CBC Radio One

Full-Power
CBI 1140 AM Sydney

Newfoundland and Labrador

CBC Radio One

Full-power
CBG 1400 AM Gander
CBGY 750 AM Bonavista
CBN 640 AM St. John's
CBY 990 AM Corner Brook

Low-power
As of 2018, all the remaining CBC low-power AM transmitters in Newfoundland and Labrador have received approval from the CRTC to convert to the FM band.

Yukon

CBC Radio One

Full-power
CBDN 560 AM Dawson City

Low-power
CBDB 990 AM Watson Lake
CBDK 940 AM Teslin
CBDM 690 AM Beaver Creek
CBQF 990 AM Carmacks
CBQJ 990 AM Ross River

Northwest Territories

CBC Radio One

Full-power
CFYK 1340 AM Yellowknife (application submitted to CRTC in July 2012 for FM conversion)
CHAK 860 AM Inuvik

Low-power
CBQG 1280 AM Wrigley

Nunavut

CBC Radio One/CBC North

Full-power
CFFB 1230 AM Iqaluit (also broadcasts in FM to some of its coverage area on a nested transmitter)

Low-power
CBIA 640 AM Gjoa Haven

See also
List of defunct CBC radio transmitters in Canada
Canadian Broadcasting Corporation

References

External links
CBC Channels and Frequencies - cbc.ca
CBC Station List - dxinfocentre.com

fr:CBC Radio